Chester Ray "Stack" Stackhouse (August 8, 1905 – June 30, 1978) was an American football and track and field coach and college athletics administrator.  He served as the head football coach at Lincoln University in Pennsylvania in 1948, Willamette University from 1949 to 1951, and Slippery Rock University of Pennsylvania from 1953 to 1954, compiling a career college football coaching record of 21–29–3.  Stackhouse was an assistant track coach at the University of Michigan from 1935 to 1941. in 1952 he joined the football coaching staff at Stanford University as an assistant under head coach Chuck Taylor.

Stackhouse was born on August 8, 1905 in Nankin, Ohio.  He died on June 30, 1978 at his farm in Turner, Oregon.  His daughter, Ann Rule, was an author of true crime books.

Head coaching record

College football

References

External links
 

1905 births
1978 deaths
American football centers
American men's basketball players
Central Michigan Chippewas football players
Central Michigan Chippewas men's basketball players
Central Michigan Chippewas men's track and field athletes
Lincoln Lions athletic directors
Lincoln Lions football coaches
Michigan Wolverines track and field coaches
Slippery Rock football coaches
Stanford Cardinal football coaches
Willamette Bearcats athletic directors
Willamette Bearcats football coaches
High school football coaches in Michigan
People from Ashland County, Ohio
Players of American football from Ohio
Basketball players from Ohio
People from Marion County, Oregon